João Pedro Geraldino dos Santos Galvão (born 9 March 1992), commonly known as João Pedro, is a professional footballer who plays as an attacking midfielder for Süper Lig club Fenerbahçe. Born in Brazil, he represents the Italy national football team.

João Pedro spent most of his career with Cagliari from 2014 to 2022, making 271 appearances and scoring  86 goals for the club. He won Serie B in 2017 and played for seven seasons in Serie A. Additionally, he had brief spells in the top divisions of Brazil, Portugal, Uruguay and Turkey.

Born in Brazil, he acquired Italian nationality and made his senior international debut in 2022.

Club career

Atlético Mineiro
Born in Ipatinga, Minas Gerais, João Pedro joined the youth ranks of Atlético Mineiro in April 2006, and made his competitive first team debut on 23 May 2010 in a game against Atlético Paranaense. His successive good performances then led head coach Vanderlei Luxemburgo to regularly select him for the Brazilian league games held between May and August 2010, also switching him from his original position of second striker to an attacking midfielder role.

Palermo
On 30 August 2010, Serie A club Palermo announced the signing of João Pedro on a five-year contract. He made his debut in the final minutes of a 2010–11 UEFA Europa League game against Sparta Prague. His Serie A debut came on 17 January 2011, as a second-half substitute for Josip Iličić in a 1–3 loss to Cagliari.

On 29 January 2011, Vitória Guimarães announced the signing of João Pedro on loan for the remainder of the season. He was sent back on 4 April for disciplinary reasons, after reacting angrily to being substituted in the first half against Sporting CP.

On 19 August 2011, Palermo loaned João Pedro to Uruguayan club Peñarol. He scored six times in his spell in Montevideo, including two on 24 September in a 4–0 win at neighbours River Plate that put his team on top of the table.

Santos / Estoril
João Pedro returned to his homeland on 5 July 2012, signing with Santos until 2014. The club purchased 20% of his economic rights from Traffic Sports Marketing, and had priority to buy 30% more.

On 1 July 2013, after not featuring with the first team in 2013 season, João Pedro rescinded with Santos and signed a one-year deal with Estoril. He scored eight times in his only full season for the Lisbon District club as they came fourth, including two on 1 March 2014 in a 4–0 home win over Olhanense.

Cagliari

João Pedro returned to Serie A on 30 August 2014, signing for Cagliari for around €1 million and exchange with Matías Cabrera. The team suffered relegation in his first season, but he scored 13 times in 38 games as they won the 2015–16 Serie B, including a hat-trick in a 6–0 home win over Brescia on 16 April.

In August 2017, João Pedro signed a new contract to last until 2021. The following 16 May, he was given a six-month ban after testing positive for banned diuretic hydrochlorothiazide following a match against Sassuolo in February.

João Pedro signed a new contract in November 2018, to last until 2022; a year later, this was extended until 2023. On 21 December 2019 he scored in a 2–1 loss at Udinese to reach 50 for the Sardinians, seventh in their all-time scorers. He finished joint-fifth in the league's top scorers with 18, his best campaign.

As Radja Nainggolan returned to Inter, João Pedro became the club captain for 2020–21. In November, he reached 200 appearances for the club. His 16 goals helped the team avoid relegation, and put him 10th in the season's scorers.

In 2021–22, João Pedro was the league's joint seventh top scorer with 13 goals, while Cagliari were relegated. This included both goals of a 2–2 comeback draw at home to Spezia in the opening game on 23 August, and a further brace on 17 October to defeat Sampdoria 3–1 at the Unipol Domus.

Fenerbahçe 
On 21 July 2022, João Pedro joined Turkish Süper Lig club Fenerbahçe on a three-year deal. The fee was reported by Italy's Sky Sport to be €6.5 million.

International career
João Pedro was a youth international for Brazil, and was part of the under-17 squad that appeared in the 2009 South American U-17 Football Championship and the 2009 FIFA U-17 World Cup. He with this team played eleven games and scored one goal.

In early 2021, it was speculated João Pedro, an Italian citizen by marriage, might be called up by the Italy national team. In November that year, he openly stated his potential interest in the opportunity. On 5 January 2022, FIFA allowed him to play for Italy. Later that month, he was formally called up by Roberto Mancini for a three-day training camp in Coverciano.

On 18 March 2022, João Pedro was selected by Mancini for a 2022 FIFA World Cup playoff against North Macedonia. He made his debut in the match six days later, as a last-minute substitute for Domenico Berardi as Italy were eliminated by a late goal in Palermo.

Personal life
João Pedro has two children with his Italian wife, originally from Palermo, whom he met during his footballing stay in Sicily. In 2017, he acquired Italian citizenship through marriage.

Career statistics

Club

International

Honours
Santos
 Recopa Sudamericana: 2012

Cagliari
 Serie B: 2015–16

References

1992 births
Living people
People from Ipatinga
Sportspeople from Minas Gerais
Italian footballers
Italy international footballers
Brazilian footballers
Brazilian emigrants to Italy
Naturalised citizens of Italy
Association football midfielders
Clube Atlético Mineiro players
Santos FC players
Palermo F.C. players
Cagliari Calcio players
Vitória S.C. players
Peñarol players
G.D. Estoril Praia players
Fenerbahçe S.K. footballers
Campeonato Brasileiro Série A players
Uruguayan Primera División players
Serie A players
Serie B players
Primeira Liga players
Süper Lig players
Brazil youth international footballers
Brazilian expatriate footballers
Brazilian expatriate sportspeople in Portugal
Brazilian expatriate sportspeople in Uruguay
Italian expatriate sportspeople in Turkey
Italian expatriate sportspeople in Uruguay
Expatriate footballers in Portugal
Expatriate footballers in Uruguay
Expatriate footballers in Turkey
Brazilian sportspeople in doping cases
Doping cases in association football